There have been four versions of the anthology television series The Twilight Zone. Each has its own episode list:
 List of The Twilight Zone (1959 TV series) episodes
 List of The Twilight Zone (1985 TV series) episodes
 List of The Twilight Zone (2002 TV series) episodes
 List of The Twilight Zone (2019 TV series) episodes

Lists of American science fiction television series episodes